Peerumedu taluk is one of the 5 taluks in Idukki district in the Indian state of Kerala. It consists of 10 revenue villages.

Constituent Villages
Peerumedu taluk has 10 villages;
Elappara, Kokkayar, Kumily, Manjumala, Mlappara, Peerumedu, Periyar, Peruvanthanam, Upputhara and Vagamon.

Demographics
As per 2011 census report, Peerumedu taluk has population of 175,622 of which 87,391 are males and 88,231 are females.
The sex-ratio of Peerumedu taluk is around 1010 compared to 1084 which is average of Kerala state. The literacy rate of Peerumade Taluk is 81.33% out of which 84.72% males are literate and 77.98% females are literate.

Languages
Malayalam is the most widely spoken language in Peerumedu taluk, followed by Tamil and others.

Religions
The majority of people in Peerumedu taluk Hindus and Christians, followed by Muslims and other minorities.

References

Taluks of Kerala